Gregor is a male given name.

Gregor may also refer to:

 Gregor (surname)
 Gregor (musician) (1898–1971), Ottoman-French musician
 GREGOR Solar Telescope
 Gregor GR-1 airplane

See also

 St. Gregor, Saskatchewan, Canada
 Gregor MacGregor (disambiguation)
 
 MacGregor (disambiguation)
 McGregor (disambiguation)
 Gregoire (disambiguation)
 Gregores (disambiguation)
 Gregory (disambiguation)
 Greg (disambiguation)